Tot, ToT or TOT may refer to:

Economics
 Total (Tot.), the summation of multiple values
 Transient occupancy tax, charged in the US
 Terms of trade, the relative price of imports in terms of exports

Organizations
 TOT (Thailand), a telecommunications company
 Total S.A., an oil company with NYSE ticker symbol TOT

People
 Tót, Hungarian surname and ethnonym

Other uses
 Transfer of technology, the process of disseminating technology
 Tots, short for Tater tots, a brand of hash browns produced by Ore-Ida
 Toddler or young child
 Rum ration, given daily to sailors on Royal Navy ships
 Theatre of Tragedy, a Norwegian band
 Time on Target, a military technique
 Tip of the tongue, a memory processing phenomenon
 Totnes railway station, Devon, England; National Rail station code
 Trail of Tears
 Trans-obturator vaginal tape, procedure for urinary incontinence
 Treaty of Tordesillas (ToT), signed 1494
 T.O.T.S., a 2019 computer-animated television series on Disney Junior
 Time in Tonga, a time zone with abbreviation TOT

See also
 Total (disambiguation)